Anthimos Selala (born 9 February 1994 in Laç) is an Albanian football player who played once for KF Laçi in the Albanian Superliga.

Club career
Selala joined German lower league side TuSpo Weser Gimte in winter 2016/17.

Honours
KF Laçi
 Albanian Cup (1): 2014–15

References

1994 births
Living people
People from Laç
Association football midfielders
Albanian footballers
KF Laçi players
Kategoria Superiore players
Albanian expatriate footballers
Albanian expatriate sportspeople in Greece
Expatriate footballers in Greece
Albanian expatriate sportspeople in Germany
Expatriate footballers in Germany